Japanese War Bride (also known as East is East) is a 1952 drama film directed by King Vidor. The film featured the American debut of Shirley Yamaguchi in the title role. In February 2020, the film was shown at the 70th Berlin International Film Festival, as part of a retrospective dedicated to King Vidor's career.

Synopsis
A wounded Korean War veteran, Jim Sterling (Don Taylor), returns to his California home with his Japanese wife. The couple had met and fallen in love in a Japanese hospital where Tae Shimizu (Shirley Yamaguchi) was working as a nurse. Back in America, the couple face racism and bigotry from their neighbors and family, particularly their sister-in-law, Fran (Marie Windsor).

Impact and legacy
The widespread publicity surrounding the film's launch made Japanese wives increasingly visible in the United States. Along with The Teahouse of the August Moon and the more successful film Sayonara, Japanese War Bride was argued by some scholars to have increased racial tolerance in the United States by openly discussing interracial marriages.

Principal cast
Shirley Yamaguchi – Tae Shimizu, a nurse, wife to Jim Sterling
Don Taylor – Captain Jim Sterling, GI in the Korean War
Cameron Mitchell – Art Sterling, Jim's older brother
Marie Windsor – Fran Sterling, Art's wife
James Bell – Ed Sterling, Jim's father
Louise Lorimer – Harriet Sterling, Jim's mother
Philip Ahn – Eitaro Shimizu, Tae's grandfather
Lane Nakano – Shiro Hasagawa, the Sterlings' Japanese-American neighbor
May Takasugi – Emma Hasagawa, Shiro's wife
Sybil Merritt – Emily Shafer,  a local girl
Orley Lindgren – Ted Sterling, Jim's younger brother	
George Wallace – Woody Blacker, a friend of Jim Sterling
Kathleen Mulqueen – Mrs. Milly Shafer, a friend of Harriet Sterling

References

Sources
 "Story of a Japanese War Bride", The New York Times, January 30, 1952.

External links

Japanese War Bride at Turner Classic Movies

1952 films
1952 drama films
20th Century Fox films
American black-and-white films
American drama films
1950s English-language films
Films about interracial romance
Films about racism
Films about veterans
Films directed by King Vidor
Films scored by Emil Newman
Films set in California
Films set in the 1950s
Korean War films
Films scored by Arthur Lange
Japan in non-Japanese culture
1950s American films